Amarjeet Shukla made his debut in Bollywood in a lead role in K.Ravi Shankar’s Iqraar By Chance (2006). It was a romantic comedy. His next movie due to release in 2009 is Runway, which also stars Tulip Joshi and Lucky Ali.

Movies

 Runway (2009) ... Allan
 Iqraar by Chance

References

Living people
Indian male television actors
Indian male film actors
1982 births